Eddie Fontaine (March 6, 1927 – April 13, 1992) was an American actor and singer, best known for television roles in the 1960s and 1970s.

Biography
Born Edward Reardon in Springfield, Massachusetts, Fontaine signed as a vocalist with RCA in 1954 after serving in the US Navy. In 1955, he appeared at the Brooklyn Paramount Theater in disc jockey Alan Freed's first rock and roll show. He also sang in the Jayne Mansfield movie The Girl Can't Help It (1956).

Musically, he is best remembered for his 1958 single "Nothin' Shakin' (But the Leaves on the Trees)", which was later covered by English rock band, The Beatles.

He is listed as a "legend" but not an inductee at the Rockabilly Hall of Fame site.

Fontaine moved to Van Nuys, California, in the 1960s after singing in night clubs in pre-Castro Cuba. He landed a role in the World War II series The Gallant Men, in which he played ladies' man PFC Pete D'Angelo, and occasionally sang.

Although he never won another regular role in a television series, Fontaine made many guest appearances on shows such as 77 Sunset Strip, Baretta, Happy Days, The Rockford Files (as a different character in four episodes) and Quincy.

In 1984, Fontaine was convicted in a murder-for-hire case. According to police documents, in 1983 Fontaine approached a country singer with the promise of a recording contract with RCA and a large sum of money if the man were to kill his estranged wife, with whom he was engaged in a custody battle. Fontaine was sentenced to four years in a California prison. He had previously been convicted of child molestation and grand larceny. Fontaine successfully appealed his murder-for-hire conviction based on the trial judge's rulings concerning these earlier offenses.

He made his last TV appearance in the series Sisters in 1991, and died of throat cancer the following year at age 65 in Roselle, New Jersey. His son, Brian LaFontaine, is a guitarist in Los Angeles.

References

External links
TV.com page on Eddie Fontaine

Discography for Eddie Fontaine (under original name of Eddie Reardon)

1927 births
1992 deaths
20th-century American guitarists
20th-century American male actors
20th-century American singers
20th-century American male singers
Actors from Springfield, Massachusetts
Apex Records artists
American male guitarists
American male television actors
American people convicted of child sexual abuse
American rock guitarists
American rockabilly guitarists
American rockabilly musicians
Deaths from cancer in New Jersey
Deaths from esophageal cancer
Decca Records artists
Guitarists from Massachusetts
Liberty Records artists
Musicians from Springfield, Massachusetts
Prisoners and detainees of California
Singers from Massachusetts
United States Navy sailors
X Records artists